Oscar Edelstein (born 12 June 1953)  is a contemporary composer from Argentina. Known for creativity and inventiveness, frequently he is described as leading Latin America's avant-garde. He is also a pianist, conductor, and researcher.

Biography 

Edelstein was born in La Paz, Argentina in the province of Entre Ríos. He spent his childhood in Paraná, Entre Rios's capital, a city known for its river Paraná, South America's second-longest river, and its name is drawn from the Tupi language, meaning "like the sea" due to its width. Entre Rios is literally the province "between rivers" (entre = "inter") and for a short time it was an independent republic – a spirit it has maintained to this day and that has influenced Edelstein.

Edelstein is from a family of musicians but his father, a road engineer, inspired him also with a love of machines and technology. He triggered Edelstein's desire to compose by a birthday present at the age of five of a Geloso portable tape recorder. It was his first instrument and tool for composition before the piano.

His early interest in creating music was not easy for many of his schoolteachers to understand. To them, all the important composers were dead, therefore it was up to Edelstein to prove that this was not true. Discovering information about living composers while living in a small province was not straightforward and required Edelstein's insatiable curiosity and persistent questioning. He was fortunate to have the imagination and open-mindedness of many of his family and teachers who brought some of the answers he needed. One piano teacher, Eva Taubas, was significant for allowing him at seven to "improvise Beethoven" in his lessons, in a sense showing him it was possible, as Edelstein puts it, "to destroy Beethoven" and construct something new.

Piano – Bed or Ship?

At twelve, his aunt, the well-known Argentine pianist Sara Zimerman, played him a Vladimir Horowitz recording, hoping to encourage him to be a classic concert pianist but in fact she gave Edelstein the big argument he needed to define his future. He remembers saying, "He has said all that you can say in this language so let me try something different."

He had a special relationship with the piano and his desire was to be another kind of player, seeing that the piano could either be a bed or a ship.

Speaking with God

One music theory teacher from Paraná would take Edelstein with him to Santa Fe Conservatoire, at the age of eleven, to try to begin his study of harmony and counterpoint as an unofficial student.  The teacher told his mother, "Oscar is unusually gifted but he really needs to be better at following the rules." His mother looked at Oscar in agreement, however when the teacher continued with advice about how the young Edelstein would also need to follow the rules more strictly in order to make his own musical experience, his mother looked at the teacher and said, "You are the professor, but he is the music." This kind of environment gave Edelstein the conviction that he could be the creative source, something he still respects to this day whenever he teaches.

Edelstein was also encouraged by a provocative "anarchist" uncle who told him, "You can believe in God if you want, but look at the priests and the rabbis, look at their faces and tell me, if God existed and was intelligent would he really need to choose this face to speak to you?" Edelstein took the underlying message of all these experiences to mean that he could be the source of the music, and therefore in his searches to become a composer he needed to link directly to composers, authors and artists.  With this in mind he began his lifetime search for originality that fuelled years of intense private study.

El Rio, Juan L. Ortiz and interference

Sitting by the river listening to a Motorola Transoceanic Radio, as a young boy, he continued to seek out "living composers." There was Argentina's national radio station broadcasting concerts from Teatro Colón far away in Buenos Aires, stations from the BBC World Service, from Japan, and all over the world; and when asked by students, at a master class in London and in Birmingham in 2007, how a person from such a small town could become interested in contemporary music, he told a story that he has often told, describing how sitting listening to the radio in a car at night, with the rain, and a storm, and the sound of the river, he never quite knew what was the music and what was the interference.

Still asking difficult questions that were difficult to answer,  Edelstein discovered Juan Laurentino Ortiz, Argentina's poet most highly respected by other writers, artists and musicians who spent the last years of his life in Paraná. Juan L. Ortiz was to profoundly influence Edelstein, and through many hours sat by the river talking, became a mentor and guide, for it was only he that had the connection to a world of literature, music and culture that could begin to answer Edelstein's intense curiosity. Many intellectuals, young people and important cultures figures came to visit Ortiz, so when he discovered news of Stockhausen he shared it with Edelstein, as well as introducing him to other great works of culture. At thirteen Edelstein went with Ortiz and some other boys on the long trip to Buenos Aires, taking the boat that crossed the river Paraná before the tunnel was built, to Teatro San Martin to see a work of John Cage and Merce Cunningham. Both the experience and the memory of it are like an extraordinary dream where Edelstein remembers dancers with mirrors, intense conversation with Ortiz, and the cultural thrill of being in Buenos Aires for the first time. Edelstein says that the sensation of being in the house of Ortiz was like being in another river, with incredible labyrinthic connections to the whole world through time and space. It was as if Ortiz had tunnels across the world, including to Mao Zedong and Chu En-Lai in Peking − who Ortiz visited in 1957 − and to authors like Jorge Luis Borges, Macedonio Fernandez, and Juan Jose Saer who all visited Ortiz in Paraná.

Buenos Aires: The Paradox

In 1972 it was with Ortiz' influence that Edelstein made the step of moving to the capital to study. He arrived in Buenos Aires with a recommendation from Ortiz to study with Juan Carlos Paz but Paz died days before he arrived (a story that Edelstein pays tribute to in his work "El Hecho") . Edelstein stayed in Buenos Aires and it was paradoxically only many years later in 1979, that he connected with Francisco Kröpfl, considered the best disciple of Paz.  With him he finally completed his study of composition by being given the most important tool – the mastery and control of pitch. This completed Edelstein's appreciation of the universe of Arnold Schoenberg and the Second Vienna School  − a world which Paz had introduced to Spanish speaking countries.

His other teachers, before Kröpfl, were the prominent Argentine composers from a different aesthetic and school, Mariano Etkin and José Maranzano. Later during the most turbulent years of the period of Argentina's "Dirty War" (1976–78), Edelstein left the country and spent nearly three years traveling and studying. His travels included two years in France, staying near Paris and also going to the Abbaye de Solesmes, visiting libraries, museums and monasteries to understand more about medieval music.

Career: revisioning and creating from nothing

Creating centres, reviews and ensembles

Edelstein's career as a composer has been characterised by breaking new ground. He directs many chamber groups of improvisation in music, frequently exploring the interplay between music and theatre, and has attained several national and international awards for his chamber and electronic productions. He is known for his technical mastery of composition, his original methods of composition and direction of improvisation, and his librettos. As a young leading Argentine composer, he was left with a strong impression from many of the principal composers that he met, such as Pierre Boulez, Mauricio Kagel, György Ligeti, Krzysztof Penderecki, Mario Davidovsky, and John Chowning. He has also helped to introduce many composers from around the world to Argentina, including Francisco Guerrero from Spain (1951–1997). However it was with Luigi Nono, who visited Buenos Aires in 1985, that there was a special and shared sense of understanding.

Centro de Investigación Musical

Between 1974 and 1977, Edelstein was a scholarship holder at the Centro de Investigaciones en Ciencia, Material, Arte y Tecnología (C.I.C.M.A.T – the former Instituto Di Tella), and between 1985 and 1986 he was one of the three young musicians selected to work at the Laboratorio de Investigación y Producción Musical (L.I.P.M.) It was here that he composed one of the works for which he is most known, Viril Occidente I. Another project of Edelstein's in L.I.P.M. was Estudio y Aplicación de los medios digitales en la Composición Musical (1989–1991),  supported by a scholarship of the Fundación Antorchas, and used by Edelstein to compose Viril Occidente II (the overture to El Telescopio).

Edelstein also held a scholarship in Science and Technology from the University of Buenos Aires (UBA) to work on several different projects related to music analysis and production with computers at the Centro de Investigación Musical (CIM-UBA), in the University of Buenos Aires. This centre was founded and directed by Edelstein, from 1985 to 1992, working with a team of professors; Pablo Di Liscia, Daniel Montes, Horacio Gutman, and Pablo Cetta. The CIM was a pioneer in the field of artificial intelligence as applied to music analysis, and the projects they developed were the first to be formally registered in Argentina.

Nueva Música, Otras Música, Antorchas' & Lulú

Edelstein was also a member of Nueva Música, the group of composers and teachers founded by Paz and continued by Kröpfl, until four years later in 1984, when Edelstein decided to create a new group with eleven composers of his generation, all from different schools and aesthetics, called Otras Músicas. As an association of composers, Otras Músicas was dedicated to the diffusion of contemporary music in the continent.

In 1991, he continued his efforts to develop Argentina's infrastructure for disseminating ideas and theories of contemporary music in Argentina, by co-founding and editing a specialist music magazine, Lulú: Revista de Teorías y Técnicas Musicales with Carla Fonseca and Federico Monjeau. It was the first journal in Latin America to be dedicated to the contemporary arts and in the editorial committee were Argentina's most important composers, musicologists, painters and writers.

In 1992 Edelstein was the youngest artist to win Argentina's prestigious award of the Antorchas Scholarship for Outstanding Artists of the Intermediate Generation which he used to compose his opera El Telescopio.

Music for Theatre

Throughout his career he has had close links with theatre, and is famous for his collaborations with the renowned Argentine theatre director, Roberto Villanueva, working with him on over twenty productions in the major theatres of Buenos Aires. Several directors in Brazil like Ge Orthof, Hugo Rodas, Fernando Villar, Silvia Davini and many others, have both staged and re-staged works of acoustic theatre by Edelstein. Edelstein has also made many works that have been used in dance, and is noted for his collaborations with the choreographer and director, Silvia Pritz.

Teaching

Edelstein is senior professor and co-founder of the degree in Music Composition in Acoustic and Electro Acoustics, at the University of Quilmes (outside Buenos Aires, see Quilmes). It is a course prominent both in Argentina and throughout the continent. As well as teaching composition for acoustic and electro-acoustic music. The course has over 500 students and many of his alumni have continued as musicians and composers in avant-garde contemporary music, and also in jazz, popular and folk music, as well as holding positions in universities around the world. Having always chosen to be an Argentine composer living in Argentina, it was only in 2007 that he made the step of introducing his work outside Latin America, by making a research trip to give concerts and master-classes in the UK.

Approaches to Style: Metaphysical Musical Experiences

Velorio del Angelito

Edelstein quotes two key metaphysical musical experiences that influence his style the most; the first was at the age of six at the funeral of a child – called by the people of the province, a "velorio del angelito" (funeral of a little angel) because, they say, when a child dies that God must have made a mistake – giving an angel to the earth which he needs to take back. Listening to this ritual at the border between the provinces of Entre Rios and Corrientes, with the different kinds of groups all playing at the same time, and the Argentine rhythms of chamamé, polka, vals criollo, cumbia, chacarera, milonga and many others, mixing together, and added to by the "lloronas" hired to cry, was like a strange nightmare or a fantastic carnival that he always returns to in his compositions trying to revisit and rewrite.

The second experience was at the age of around fourteen, when he first heard Stockhausen. Edelstein says, "All my life I have been trying to cover this kind of distance." In an interview he noted, "This kind of contradiction between the tragedy, the fiesta and the glory is the representation of the essential spirit of Argentina's story, also epitomized by our national heroes like, Eva Peron, Che Guevara, Carlos Gardel, and Diego Maradona."

What is different in Edelstein is his strong opposition to some nationalist academic folcloristas from Argentina, and also for some pseudo popular-folkloric musicians (who as he has pointed out only can understand these experiences in the European style – like tourists in their own land - and they make "folclore a la húngara" (Hungarian mode)). They look at Argentine popular folkloric music like someone looking at something through a window, or as Edelstein frequently says, "Like someone with a hooped-skirt in their brain." In his experience of the "velorio del angelito" he heard and absorbed the whole experience in all its emotional intensity – "I am a popular musician who has studied"  – something which now gives him the ability to create space and textures in his complex musical language whilst retaining a strong connection with the impulse and imagination of the popular. In this way he contributes to the increase of the stature and imagination of Argentine music, but more in the line of Heitor Villa-Lobos (Brazil) where he says that "the folkloric is me" – just as Borges "enhanced" the story of the orilleros and gauchos.

Alongside these experiences the effect of a childhood spent close to a powerful river, in the province "between rivers," can also be said to have had a profound influence on his music, especially as Ortiz guided him to begin his study of art by first studying nature, including giving him Maurice Maeterlinck's books about bees and spiders.

"Composition in the Act"

His album in 2006 Dos Improntuswith renowned accordionist, Raúl Barboza, was a meeting of different musical worlds.  Edelstein's intention was that through playing together in a process of composition in the moment (rather than formally writing) he would create a new kind of synthesis of the Argentine experience and history of music. The disc has caused much discussion and is influencing musical culture in Argentina and Latin America, including becoming sited in various research works.

Other examples of Edelstein's kind of essential synthesis (but in these cases fully scored) are Tangos Cientificos [Scientific Tangos], Viril Occidente II, Klange Urutaú and La Teoría Sagrada del Espacio Acústico – Libro I with the ENS, O Tiempo, La Condena and Alma's Waltz. Alma's Waltz, written for his daughter, was composed to sound simple but is in actuality incredibly difficult to play − the idea being that only the man who could succeed in playing it could ask for his daughter's hand in marriage. The waltz has attained such popularity that many people do not know its author and believe that it is an anonymous traditional folk waltz - a fact that Edelstein greatly enjoys.

 Argentina & Andrómeda 
Edelstein is informed by the tradition of the Argentine intellectual avant-garde and as such many comparisons have been made to musicians, like Charles Ives, Karlheinz Stockhausen, Edgard Varèse and John Cage, but also to more popular or rock musicians like Hermeto Pascoal, Frank Zappa, and King Crimson. Edelstein says, "Critics and specialists sometimes make comparisons in order to try to explain me to others who don't know my work. I really appreciate their intent because we always understand in our own dimension. I know that I am not so "important" or popular but I am sure that I am totally new."

Comparisons to Cage are often made because of his multi-disciplinary universe and his cutting edge ideas, however his music in contrast to Cage's can be described as Maximilist.

Edelstein is seen as emerging from three sources; the tradition of the contemporary music of Argentina, in the line of composers who he very much appreciates, such as Juan Carlos Paz, Francisco Kröpfl, Carmelo Saitta, Gerardo Gandini, Mariano Etkin and many others; the popular musicians like Isaco Abitbol, Raúl Barboza, Remo Pignoni, Dino Saluzzi and Cuchi Leguizamón, to name but a few that he listened to whilst growing up; and equally to the colleagues and the composers of his generation that contributed to making the group Otras Musicas, including Pablo Di Liscia, Gustavo Mirabile and Daniel Montes. However, now like Arnold Schönberg, Edelstein says, he learns most from his students, and the ENS (Ensamble Nacional del Sur) is an example of this.

Students have asked Edelstein that if Stockhausen receives his influences from andrómeda, what radiation does he receive; he always replies with a smile, "Well, I am andrómeda!"

The scope of his artistic visions, which include a new system of composition, design of instruments, theory, notation and theatre, could be compared to a Wagnerian's ideal, but Edelstein insists that he is more Argentine and Latin American – in other words more innocent, imaginative, ironic and hopefully little less ridiculous. He says enigmatically, "In the classic Woody Allen joke when you hear Wagner you want to invade Poland, I hope when you hear my music you want to do the hippo-campo dance." He goes on to say that it is hard for a European or for an Argentine formed in the classic European tradition of music to understand that life in the little province is spent between racing cars, poetry, music, horses, football and women.

New Techniques: Methods in Notation, Composition & Improvisation − Conducting as an Element of Composition

Research − Teatro Acústico / Acoustic Theatre

Edelstein is currently, Senior professor, Head of Composition (Acoustic and Electro Acoustic), and Director of a research programme at the University of Quilmes, in 2006 his research programme into new musical theories and acoustic techniques, the Programa de investigación Teatro Acústico, won another landmark victory – it received funding from the Agencia de Promocion Científica y Tecnologica (a government agency that depends from the Argentinian Ministerio de Ciencia, Tecnología e Innovación Productiva, - the first time that a project in the arts has been awarded science funding and thus it was a major breakthrough for Edelstein's research group. Working with a team of mathematicians, physicists, engineers, composers and musicians, Edelstein is developing his original ideas for new materials, techniques and approaches in spatial acoustics for theatre.  His ideas of Acoustic Theatre  include; a new system of control and notation of the acoustic space (The Acoustic Grid); entirely acoustic (non-electronic) techniques for a new system of composition; the creation a new kind of acoustic instrument (acousmonium); and the acoustic design of a new theatre. Edelstein's team are utilizing new materials based in the principal of sonic crystals to modulate the architecture of the acoustic space so as to add a new real-time parameter of control in a musical performance. Their researches will make the space itself an instrument for the contemporary composer. The register of this work made in collaboration with the physicist, Manuel Eguía, has been produced in the University of Quilmes, Argentina, and the first international publication is in Germany in 2007.

Edelstein has been invited to many important institutions to give masterclasses and lectures based on his theories of composition and concept of "Acoustic Theatre", namely in Manhattan School of Music, and Columbia University (USA); Royal College of Music, Guildhall School of Music, University of Central England, Royal Northern College of Music and Drama, and the University of Wales –  Aberystwyth (UK); and the University of Music and Performing Arts (Vienna) amongst others.

Ensamble Nacional del Sur

His electro acoustic group, the Ensamble Nacional del Sur  (ENS for short) are hugely popular, critically acclaimed as revolutionary, achieving a cult following in both Brazil and Argentina, and seen by Edelstein as a new instrument of composition. Created by Edelstein in 1997, as a working group of research, creation and independent music production, they were conceived as a musical lab composed of musicians, composers, artists and technicians. Edelstein works with systems of traditional notation combined with new and 3-dimensional models that he created. He conducts the group with his specially developed system of hand signals so that he can not only designate time and intensity but also timbrical and spatial options. The members of the ENS are composers as well as musicians and thus could effectively respond to these directions. They have played in a number of Edelstein's acoustic theatre works, including the first part of the trilogy La Teoría Sagrada del Espacio Acoustico – Libro I (2000–2001); Klange, Klange, Urutau (1997) − described by Clarín's music critic Federico Monjeau as "an hour of music without interruptions, and without a moment of weakness"; and El Hecho (1998) which Monjeau called "a profound theatrical idea and fascinating music." Critic Martín Liut commented, "Oscar Edelstein opens new horizons for modern music and opera in Argentina." In 1999 Edelstein presented El Tiempo, La Condena in Brazil and Argentina, critics called the work a "shock of music and the avantgarde in the heart of Brazil." Their performances were considered as "the most important musical events of the last decade in Argentina.". Since its creation in 1997,  Oscar Edelstein has brought together and trained many talented young musicians. The current group is: Axel Lastra (Piano & Keyboards), Leonardo Salzano (Electric Guitar), Pablo Torterolo (Drums), and Mauro Zannoli (Keyboards and Processing). Regular guest artists are Deborah Claire Procter (Vocals) and Martín Proscia (Saxophone). Other guest musicians for the recent live concerts of Studies for The Acoustic Grid - Book II include Carlos Adriano Herrera (Bassoon), Soko Rodrigo (Flute), and Federico Linari (Harmonica). Past permanent members were Mario Castelli, Nicolás Varchausky, Mariano Cura, Richard Arce, Jerónimo Carmona, and Diego Romero Mascaró. Temporary members have been Pablo Chimenti, Hernán Kerlleñevich, Damián Anache, Nahuel Tavosnanska, Alfonso Ollúa, Rosa Nolly, Maria Laura Antonelli, and many others. In 2014, for the most recent disc, the ensemble was joined by prestigious Argentinean artists, pianist-composer Ernesto Jodos and wood wind multi-instrumentalist Marcelo Moguilevsky.

La Teoría Sagrada del Espacio Acoustico – Libro I

In 2004, La Teoría Sagrada del Espacio Acoustico – Libro I was recorded in Super Audio by the Ensamble Nacional del Sur. It was critically acclaimed and created a considerable excitement as the first disc in Latin America to be recorded in Super Audio (5.1) and as the first work in the world to have been specifically composed for this system. Edelstein both conducted the ENS and played the piano alongside, Mariano Cura (Keyboards / Technical Head), Nicolás Varchausky (Electric Guitar), Diego Romero Mascaró (Drums & Percussion), Mario Castelli (Piano), Jerónimo Carmona (Bass & Double Bass) and Richard Arce (Electric Guitar).

 El Hecho [The Fact] El Hecho [The Fact] (1998), due to its popularity and controversy, was performed over fifty times, which is unusual for a new opera. The work was made in memory of Juan Carlos Paz, inspired by Paz' graphic design, Seis eventos [Six Events] which was Paz' last work but which was never musically realised it was the first work to pay homage to the famous Argentine composer and in it Edelstein also makes reference to his thwarted attempt to study with Paz.   Performed with the Ensamble Nacional del Sur (ENS) and three actor-singers, in the story a caricature of a theoretician desperately tries to explain Paz's mysterious designs, whilst in contrast, a female character, who represents a voice that travels through time and space, makes references that could be taken as reminisces about the life of Paz. The character of Paz enters and listens to the two monologues, at first saying nothing but then finally shooting the theoretician, at which point "the voice" dies in Paz's arms and he recovers his voice, takes the gun and acts as if to shoot the other musicians (the ENS), including Edelstein as conductor, but finally puts the gun on Edelstein's piano.  This tribute to the teacher he never had stirred debate about the position and relationship between the composer and the academy of music. The work was described as "brilliant" and "the most important opera in the story of Argentina."

 Opera 
Many of Edelstein's works are grounded in the field of "the extended theatre of music", where he stresses a focus on voice, speech production and the interplay with technology. Often he works with non-classically trained singers and choirs, training them to develop a specific sound colour. He has a "guest choir" of voices that will often appear in his compositions. He prefers to describe his works as acoustic theatre, feeling that the word opera both does not fit many of his works that use electro acoustics and not the traditional orchestra. The two most recent works are 'La Carta Imaginaria'  (2014)  - commissioned by the Ministerio de Cultura de la Nación for the Ciclo Iberoamericano de Ópera Contemporánea, and "El Caballo Fantasma"  (2011) - multimedia musical performance commissioned by the Ministerio de Cultura de la Nación.

 Eterna Flotación - Los monstruito (2006) 

In 2006, C.E.T.C., the experimental wing of Buenos Aires' opera house, Teatro Colón, commissioned and produced his opera Eterna Flotación-Los monstruito As often is the case in his works, the libretto was written by Edelstein, this time adapting poems from Lo Dado by Rodolfo Enrique Fogwill. The Clarín reviewed it as "Original, innovative – some pieces are like from the anthology of opera."  It was the first musical work to speak about the presidency of Carlos Menem. In the middle of scenes depicting the incredible decadence that Argentina fell into, Edelstein has a murga''' – a street-musical group common in Uruguay and Argentina often present at political protests – erupt into the theatre, cutting across conventional lines of opera as a "high" art. The final aria of the work is Edelstein's setting of "El Rio," a poem by Juan L. Ortiz, that he uses to make a contrast with the scenes of decadence and decay.

 Tiradentes (2003) 

Having written over 14 works of what Edelstein prefers to call Acoustic Theatre − it is "Tiradentes" that is perhaps the most noteworthy for its scale and vision. With the subtitle, "The Dream of Heroes" it was the first opera to speak about a figure who Edelstein calls "Brazil's only real national hero", "Tiradentes" was an opera to take place over three days, about the man who led a revolt "La conspiración de Minas Gerais."  Way before the French Revolution, it was the first act of self-determination in Brazil, which many years later contributed to Brazil's independence, which happened much later than the rest of Latin America.
As a joint project between the universities of Quilmes (Argentina) and Brasilia (Brazil) it was to be staged throughout Brasilia's model city. The complex project involved a team of more than two hundred actors, plastics artists, technicians and musicians from both countries, and received the backing of UNESCO and funding from prominent foundations. However, the project was ultimately postponed by a combination of factors, including the controversy that the history of Tiradentes provoked (such as Tiradentes' known links to the freemasons), political and diplomatic problems between Argentina and Brazil, and political issues in Brazil. Though it is a project that was fully conceived, composed and scored by Edelstein; finally only part of it was performed. Edelstein hopes to one day complete the project.

 Orchestral 
In recent years Edelstein has decided to return to writing for orchestra. In 2010 this decision led to a commission from Orquesta Sinfónica Nacional, under the direction of Pedro Ignacio Calderón with the soloist Eduardo Isaac (guitar) and called "La Foto Del Tiempo."  Then in 2011 came a commission from Basel Sinfonietta leading to "Cristal Argento I"  and a premiere conducted by José Luis Gomez - who had just won first prize in the International Conductor's Competition of Sir Georg Solti at the Alte Oper in Frankfurt, and went gone on to be in 2016 the new musical director of the Tucson Symphony Orchestra. Both works used live electronic processing. Edelstein has a new major orchestral work in process.

Other recent works
 La Calesa en la Luna (2015) - Saxophone quartet
 La Carta Imaginaria (2014) - Opera commissioned by the Ministerio de Cultura de la Nación for the Ciclo Iberoamericano de Ópera Contemporánea 
 El Caballo Fantasma (2011) - Multimedia musical performance commissioned by the Ministerio de Cultura de la Nación 
 ION (2007) - for piano with an accompanying film.
 Rivers and Mirrors: Part I (2007) - piano, voice and video. Edelstein uses his aria, "El Rio", again in his work Rivers and Mirrors: Part I'' with singer Deborah Claire Procter (Wales) who also made the film to accompany the performance with the dancer Sandra Grinberg of the Trisha Brown Dance Company. This recital, in which Edelstein plays the piano, was premiered in the UK in 2007 to an enthusiastic response from audiences and critics. where Edelstein's piano technique was described as "formidable". 
Also he never had a shower.

Footnotes

Press

External links
Sala Cristal Sónico / Sonic Crystal Room
Teatro Acústico / Acoustic Theatre
Laboratorio de Acústica y Percepción Sonora LAPSO
Ensamble Nacional del Sur
Los Monstruito
List of Works

1953 births
Living people
20th-century classical composers
Experimental composers
Argentine pianists
Male pianists
Argentine composers
Argentine classical composers
21st-century classical composers
Male classical composers
Argentine opera composers
20th-century male musicians
21st-century male musicians
21st-century Argentine male artists